Phrynops hilarii, commonly known as Hilaire’s toadhead turtle or Hilaire’s side-necked turtle, is a species of freshwater turtle in the family Chelidae. The species is endemic to South America.

Etymology
The specific name, hilarii, is in honor of French zoologist Isidore Geoffroy Saint-Hilaire.

Geographic range
P. hilarii is found in southern Brazil (Santa Catarina and Rio Grande do Sul), southward and westward into Uruguay and Argentina, and possibly also in Paraguay and Bolivia.

Habitat
These turtles inhabit streams, lakes and swamps with abundant aquatic vegetation and  soft bottoms.

Description

Phrynops hilarii has an oval, flattened carapace, with a maximum length of approximately 40 cm, weighing approximately 5 kg. The carapace is usually dark brown, olive, or gray, with a yellow border. The head is large and flat, gray to olive above, with a pointed snout and two bicolored chin barbels There is a black band on each side of the head, which comes out of the muzzle and passes over the eyes, going up to the neck.

Biology
This omnivorous species mainly feed on arthropods, with a preference for copepods, ostracods, and hemipterans.  They feed also on fish, birds, reptiles, small mammals and dead animals. It is oviparous.  These turtles can live for up to 37 years.   

Females lay twice a year, one between February and May and the other between September and December. They lay from 9 to 14 eggs, with a maximum of 32 eggs and an incubation period of approximately 150 days.

References

Further reading
Boulenger, George Albert (1889). Catalogue of the Chelonians, Rhynchocephalians, and Crocodiles in the British Museum (Natural History). New Edition. London: Trustees of the British Museum (Natural History). (Taylor and Francis, printers). x + 311 pp. + Plates I-III. (Hydraspis hilarii: p. 220, figure 59, three views of skull; p. 221, figure 60, carapace and plastron; p. 222, species description).

hilarii
Turtles of South America
Reptiles of Brazil
Reptiles of Paraguay
Reptiles of Uruguay
Reptiles described in 1835
Taxa named by André Marie Constant Duméril
Taxa named by Gabriel Bibron